The 7th constituency of Maine-et-Loire (French: Septième circonscription de Maine-et-Loire) is a French legislative constituency in the Maine-et-Loire département. Like the other 576 French constituencies, it elects one MP using a two round electoral system.

Description
The 7th Constituency of Maine-et-Loire is situated in the north west of the department, including the north and north-western suburbs of Angers.

In common with other several seats in Maine-et-Loire for example the 1st, 5th and 6th this constituency had a long tradition of supporting centre right candidates. This tradition was broken at the 2017 election with the election of the MoDem candidate, during which election the conservative The Republicans party secured just 38% of the second round vote.

Assembly members

Election results

2022

2017

 
 
 
 
 
 
|-
| colspan="8" bgcolor="#E9E9E9"|
|-

2012

 
 
 
 
 
 
|-
| colspan="8" bgcolor="#E9E9E9"|
|-

References

7